The 1832 United States presidential election in Pennsylvania took place between November 2 and December 5, 1832, as part of the 1832 United States presidential election. Voters chose 30 representatives, or electors to the Electoral College, who voted for President and Vice President.

Pennsylvania voted for the Democratic candidate, Andrew Jackson, over the Anti-Masonic candidate, William Wirt. Jackson won Pennsylvania by a margin of 15.92%. National Republican candidate Henry Clay did not appear on the official ballot.

Although Martin Van Buren was nominated as Jackson's running mate nationally, Pennsylvania's 30 electors choose native William Wilkins as his running mate instead.

Although Wirt lost Pennsylvania, with 42.04 percentage points, the Keystone State would prove to be his strongest in terms of popular vote percentage. Vermont, the only state to vote for Wirt, only gave him 40.79 percentage points.

Results

See also
 List of United States presidential elections in Pennsylvania

Notes

References

Pennsylvania
1832
1832 Pennsylvania elections